Hedya zoyphium is a species of moth of the family Tortricidae. It is found in Colombia.

The wingspan is about 14 mm. The ground colour of the forewings is grey, in the basal area slightly mixed with cream and with whitish costal strigulae (fine streaks). The markings are blackish brown, edged with whitish grey. The hindwings are brown, but whiter towards the base.

Etymology
The species name refers to the size of the species and is derived from Greek zoyphion (meaning a
small animal).

References

	

Moths described in 2011
Olethreutini